Eva Johanne Arndt (later Riise, 27 November 1919 – 18 June 1993) was a Danish backstroke and freestyle swimmer who competed in the 1936 Summer Olympics and in the 1948 Summer Olympics.

She was born in Aarhus and died in Gjesing, Rougsø Municipality.

In 1936 she was a member of the Danish relay team which finished seventh in the 4×100-metre freestyle relay event. In the 100-metre freestyle competition she was eliminated in the first round.

Twelve years later she won the silver medal with the Danish relay team in the 4×100-metre freestyle relay event.

External links

Olympic swimmers of Denmark
Swimmers at the 1936 Summer Olympics
Swimmers at the 1948 Summer Olympics
Olympic silver medalists for Denmark
Medalists at the 1948 Summer Olympics
1919 births
1993 deaths
Sportspeople from Aarhus
World record setters in swimming
European Aquatics Championships medalists in swimming
Danish female butterfly swimmers
Danish female freestyle swimmers